Sinatra–Basie: An Historic Musical First (a.k.a. Sinatra-Basie) is a 1962 studio album by Frank Sinatra, arranged by Neal Hefti.

This was the first recording that Sinatra made with the Count Basie Orchestra. In 1964, Sinatra and Basie would make a final studio recording, It Might as Well Be Swing, orchestrated by Quincy Jones, and Sinatra's first live album, Sinatra at the Sands (1966) would feature the Basie band.

Sinatra appeared on an episode of The Dinah Shore Show that aired on December 9, 1962, the day before Sinatra-Basie was released, and performed the album's arrangement of "Please Be Kind".

According to Will Friedwald's book, Sinatra! The Song Is You: 
"Basie didn't play piano on several of the tracks: 'The day before the first date, we rehearsed all day, all night', said [Sinatra's longtime pianist] Bill Miller, officially serving as contractor. 'Everybody also came in an hour before so we could go over them again.' As Joe Bushkin has pointed out, 'The Basie guys could read [sheet music] as well as any studio band', but to help them nail the charts even tighter, Sinatra and Miller brought in ace lead trumpeter Al Porcino. Basie was a capable but not an expert reader, Miller continued, 'and he was very slow to learn new tunes, so on a couple of the songs, he said, "You play it."' Long story short, Bill Miller played piano on 'Pennies from Heaven.'"

Track listing
 "Pennies from Heaven" (Arthur Johnston, Johnny Burke) – 3:29
 "Please Be Kind" (Saul Chaplin, Sammy Cahn) – 2:43
 "(Love Is) The Tender Trap" (Cahn, Jimmy Van Heusen) – 2:37
 "Looking at the World Through Rose Colored Glasses" (Jimmy Steiger, Tommy Mailie) – 2:32
 "My Kind of Girl" (Leslie Bricusse) – 4:37
 "I Only Have Eyes for You" (Harry Warren, Al Dubin) – 3:31
 "Nice Work If You Can Get It" (George Gershwin, Ira Gershwin) – 2:37
 "Learnin' the Blues" (Dolores Vicki Silvers) – 4:25
 "I'm Gonna Sit Right Down and Write Myself a Letter" (Fred Ahlert, Joe Young) – 2:36
 "I Won't Dance" (Jerome Kern, Jimmy McHugh, Oscar Hammerstein II, Dorothy Fields, Otto Harbach) – 4:07

Personnel
 Frank Sinatra – vocals
 Count Basie – piano
 Bill Miller – piano
 Eric Dixon – flute, tenor saxophone
 Frank Wess – flute, alto saxophone, tenor saxophone
 Frank Foster – tenor saxophone
 Marshall Royal – clarinet, alto saxophone
 Charlie Fowlkes – baritone saxophone
 Al Aarons – trumpet
 Sonny Cohn – trumpet
 Thad Jones – trumpet
 Al Porcino – trumpet
 Fip Ricard – trumpet
 Henry Coker – trombone
 Benny Powell – trombone
 Rufus Wagner – trombone
 Buddy Catlett – bass
 Freddie Green – guitar
 Sonny Payne – drums

References

1962 albums
Albums arranged by Neal Hefti
Albums conducted by Neal Hefti
Collaborative albums
Count Basie Orchestra albums
Frank Sinatra albums
Reprise Records albums